Piana degli Albanesi Cathedral, in full the Cathedral of Saint Demetrius the Martyr of Thessaloniki is a cathedral in Piana degli Albanesi, Sicily, Italy. It is the seat of the Eparchy of Piana degli Albanesi, part of the Byzantine Rite Italo-Albanian Catholic Church.

References

External links
  http://sandemetriopiana.blogspot.com.br/?m=1
 http://www.beweb.chiesacattolica.it/cattedrali/cattedrale/652/Chiesa+di+San+Demetrio+Megalomartire

Eastern Catholic cathedrals in Italy
Cathedrals in Sicily
Churches in the metropolitan city of Palermo
Italo-Albanian Catholic cathedrals